Roseovarius aestuariivivens is a Gram-negative, aerobic and non-motile bacterium from the genus of Roseovarius which has been isolated from tidal flat sediments from the South Sea in Korea.

References

External links
Type strain of Roseovarius aestuariivivens at BacDive -  the Bacterial Diversity Metadatabase

Rhodobacteraceae
Bacteria described in 2017